Hyldgaard is a surname. Notable people with the surname include:

Morten Hyldgaard (born 1978), Danish footballer
Søren Hyldgaard (born 1962), Danish composer

Danish-language surnames